Elections were held in Prescott and Russell United Counties, Ontario on October 27, 2014 in conjunction with municipal elections across the province.

Prescott and Russell United Counties Council
The Council consists of the mayors of the eight constituent municipalities:

Mayors and councillors not seeking re-election 
The following mayors and municipal councillors announced they were not seeking re-election :

Councillors
Érik Bazinet, Russell
Craig Cullen, Russell
Gabriel Dussault, East Hawkesbury
Mario Laplante, Casselman
Linda Séguin, East Hawkesbury

Alfred and Plantagenet

Casselman

Champlain

Clarence-Rockland

East Hawkesbury

Hawkesbury

Russell

Councillors

There are 4 seats being contested for Russell Town Council.

Incumbent Eric Bazinet and interim councillor Calvin Pol are not re-run again in 2014.

By-election for mayor
A by-election for mayor will be held from December 12 to 15 after the death of Jean-Paul St. Pierre on October 18 at the age of 65, while trying to get re-elected on October 27. One candidate for mayor, his cousin Donald St. Pierre has decided to suspend his campaign until further notice, but he is now registered as one of four candidates.

At least the election of four new candidates for the post of councilors continue as scheduled on October 27. One of the nine candidates Raymond St. Pierre, the brother of former mayor announces that do not intend to present a candidate for mayor, although he stopped campaigning for the time after the announcement the death of his brother.

Potential candidates
This list is not exhaustive and includes all individuals who have a demonstrated interest in the position of the municipality or whose name has circulated in the media:
Pierre Leroux, councillor since 2010.
Donald Saint-Pierre, current candidate for mayor and cousin of Jean-Paul Saint-Pierre.
Ronald Thériault, Russell's resident.
Jamie Laurin, current councillor.

Declined 
Marc-Antoine Gagnier, candidate independent of Glengarry-Prescott-Russell to Ontario election Thursday, June 12, 2014.
Raymond Saint-Pierre, current candidate for councilor and brother of Jean-Paul Saint-Pierre.

Results

The Nation

References

AMO - 2014 Municipal Election Results

Prescott
United Counties of Prescott and Russell